In enzymology, a naringenin 8-dimethylallyltransferase is an enzyme that catalyzes the chemical reaction

dimethylallyl diphosphate + (-)-(2S)-naringenin  diphosphate + sophoraflavanone B

Thus, the two substrates of this enzyme are dimethylallyl diphosphate and (-)-(2S)-naringenin, whereas its two products are diphosphate and sophoraflavanone B.

This enzyme belongs to the family of transferases, specifically those transferring aryl or alkyl groups other than methyl groups.  The systematic name of this enzyme class is dimethylallyl-diphosphate:naringenin 8-dimethylallyltransferase. This enzyme is also called N8DT.

References

 
 

EC 2.5.1
Enzymes of unknown structure